Berosus pulchellus, is a species of water scavenger beetle found in Oriental, Australasian, Afrotropical and Palaearctic regional countries such as India, Sri Lanka, Hong Kong, Japan, Iran, Cambodia and Australia.

Description
This slender, medium-sized aquatic beetle with an average length of about 3.7 mm, has an ovate body. The outline of the body is not interrupted between pronotum and elytra. Head fully and pronotum partially with metallic in color. Pronotum consists with double punctures whereas the posterior angle is obtuse and well-defined. Elytra possess 10 rows of punctured striae. Middle and hind tibia are long with conspicuous swimming hair. Male beetle has 4-segmented fore tarsi. There is no posteriorly elevated mesosternal carina. Lateral margins of the metasternal process are evenly confluent.

References 

Hydrophilidae
Insects of Sri Lanka
Insects described in 1825